Constantine Palaiologos or Palaeologus may refer to:
Constantine Palaiologos (half-brother of Michael VIII) (d.1271), half-brother of Michael VIII Palaiologos and grandfather of Theodora Smilets of Bulgaria
 Constantine Palaiologos (son of Michael VIII) (1261–1306), son of Michael VIII Palaiologos
 Constantine Palaiologos (son of Andronikos II) (fl. 1292–1320s), despotes, son of Andronikos II Palaiologos
 Constantine XI Palaiologos (1405–1453), last ruler of the Byzantine Empire in 1449–1453
Constantine Palaiologos (Papal Guard) (d. 1508), commander of the Papal Guard, possibly son of Andreas Palaiologos